Purlisa gigantea is a butterfly in the family Lycaenidae. It was described by William Lucas Distant in 1881. It is found in the Indomalayan realm, where it has been recorded from Thailand, Peninsular Malaysia, Sumatra and Borneo.

References

External links
Purlisa at Markku Savela's Lepidoptera and Some Other Life Forms

Purlisa
Butterflies described in 1881